The Breakaway Tour was the first headlining concert tour by American pop recording artist Kelly Clarkson. It began on March 30, 2005, in Tulsa, Oklahoma and finished on March 23, 2006, in Vienna, Austria. The tour promoted her sophomore studio album, Breakaway (2004), and this was her first tour to visit Australia and Europe. This was the first of three tours to promote Breakaway. Clarkson went on to embark on the Hazel Eyes Tour in North America before and in between the Australian and European legs of this tour.

Background
The North American leg of the tour was announced in February 2005. In September 2005, the Australian leg was announced.

Opening acts
Graham Colton Band  
Rogue Traders

Setlist
"Since U Been Gone"
"Walk Away"
"Gone"
"Low"
"Just Missed the Train"
"What's Up Lonely"
"Thankful"
"The Trouble with Love Is"
"Don't"
"Covers medley: "Piece of My Heart" / "The Thrill Is Gone" / "Sweet Dreams (Are Made of This)"
"Beautiful Disaster"
"Addicted"
"Because of You"
"Where is Your Heart"
"Behind These Hazel Eyes"
Encore
"Miss Independent"
"A Moment Like This"
"Breakaway"

Tour dates

Festivals and other miscellaneous performances
This concert was a part of "Channel 933's Your Show"
This concert was a part of "Wango Tango"
This concert was a part of "Beauty Live"

Canceled shows

External links
Kelly Clarkson Official Website
Breakaway Tour

References

2005 concert tours
2006 concert tours
Kelly Clarkson concert tours